
Gmina Kawęczyn is a rural gmina (administrative district) in Turek County, Greater Poland Voivodeship, in west-central Poland.

Villages
Gmina Kawęczyn contains the villages and settlements of Będziechów, Chocim, Ciemień, Dzierzbotki, Dziewiątka, Głuchów, Kawęczyn, Kowale Pańskie, Kowale Pańskie-Kolonia, Leśnictwo, Marcinów, Marcjanów, Marianów, Marianów-Kolonia, Milejów, Młodzianów, Nowy Czachulec, Nowy Świat, Okręglica, Siedliska, Skarżyn, Stanisława, Tokary Drugie, Tokary Pierwsze, Wojciechów and Żdżary.

Neighbouring gminas
Gmina Kawęczyn is bordered by the gminas of Ceków-Kolonia, Dobra, Goszczanów, Lisków, Malanów, Przykona and Turek.

References
Polish official population figures 2006

Kaweczyn
Turek County